Doc Savage: His Apocalyptic Life is a fictional biography by Philip José Farmer about pulp fiction hero Doc Savage.

The book is written with the assumption that Doc Savage was a real person. Kenneth Robeson, the author of the Doc Savage novels, is portrayed as writing fictionalized memoirs of the real Savage's life. Farmer examines the psychological make up of Doc and his associates, based on close readings of the 181 novels. In an appendix, "The Fabulous Family Tree of Doc Savage", Farmer links Savage to dozens of other fictional characters as a member of the Wold Newton family.

Editions
 1973, Doubleday, hardcover
 1975, Bantam, paperback (expanded)
 1981, Playboy, paperback (expanded)
 2013, Meteor House, hardcover (revised, expanded again)
 2013, Altus Press, paperback (revised)

External links
The Doc Savage Chronology from The Wold Newton Universe website

1973 American novels
Doc Savage
Wold Newton family
Novels by Philip José Farmer
Crossover novels
Doubleday (publisher) books